The Dead Eye is the fifth studio album by Swedish metal band The Haunted. It was released on 30 October 2006.

The "bloodpack" edition includes the collectors edition DVD, promotional button, two-sided guitar pick, t-shirt, and a floating dead eyeball.

In 2006, Century Media also released "The Dead Eye" on 12" vinyl (120 gram), with the initial artwork and inserts (not the limited edition packaging). It contains the 13 tracks on the standard releases.

Track listing 
For the Japanese edition of the album, the song "The Burden" is placed on track 13, and the song "The Program" has lyrics.

The collectors US, European and Japanese editions also feature a bonus DVD.

Credits 
All music: Anders Björler / Jonas Björler (& Dolving)
All lyrics: Peter Dolving

The Haunted
Peter Dolving – vocals
Patrik Jensen – rhythm guitar
Anders Björler – lead guitar
Jonas Björler – bass
Per Möller Jensen – drums

Production
Drums recorded at Puk Studio, Denmark, 1–7 May 2006
Additional recordings at Antfarm Studio, Denmark, 8–31 May 2006
Mixed and mastered by Tue Madsen at Antfarm Studio, Denmark, 1–15 June 2006
Graphic design by Swedish Arms

References 

2006 albums
The Haunted (Swedish band) albums
Century Media Records albums
Albums produced by Tue Madsen